SZABIST is a multi-campus private university with multiple campuses in various major cities of Pakistan and the United Arab Emirates. Its main campus is located in Karachi, Sindh, Pakistan.

Overview
Begun in 1995 under the vision of its founder Pakistani Ex-Prime Minister Benazir Bhutto and led by Dr. Javaid Laghari as its first president and project director, SZABIST is honored and named in remembrance of Shaheed Zulfiqar Ali Bhutto. Financial endowment and research funding are coordinated by the leadership of the Pakistan Peoples Party. The university offers undergraduate and post-graduate degrees. It is a member of the Association of Commonwealth Universities of the United Kingdom and the Association to Advance Collegiate Schools of Business, as well as other international education associations. SZABIST is regarded as one of the more notable private research institutions of higher learning in Pakistan and ranked among the nation's top-ten institutions by the Higher Education Commission, as of 2013.

In addition, its business management program is listed as top ranking by the publication Business Week and is ranked among other noticeable science institutions by CNN & Time and Asiaweek. SZABIST is identified as a major centre of higher learning in Pakistan and is one of the largest private universities in the country by area, according to the HEC.

Global recognition
SZABIST is a Pakistani institute to have been recognized internationally:
 BusinessWeek, the leading international business magazine, listed SZABIST among the best business schools internationally for six years (2001, 2002, 2003, 2004, 2006 and 2008).
 Asia Inc. ranked SZABIST among the top MBA Schools of South Asia in its "Asia's Best MBA Schools Survey" for two consecutive years (2003, 2004).
 SZABIST was ranked among the best Science and Technology and MBA schools in Asia by the CNN-Time publication, Asiaweek.
 SZABIST was featured in the CNN Executive Education Schools, 2009.

Academics
The school offers programs in management sciences, computer sciences, media sciences, law, economics, engineering, public health, biosciences and social sciences. Some of the programs are external and offered in collaboration with universities in the UK. The following is a list of offered degrees:

Management Sciences: Bachelor of business administration (BBA), BS in Accounting & Finance (BS A&F), BS in entrepreneurship, Executive Master of Business Administration, Master of Business Administration (MBA), Master of Project Management (MPM), MS in Project Management (MSPM), Master of Science (MS) in Management Sciences and Doctor of Philosophy (Ph.D.) in Management Sciences.
Computer science: Bachelor of Science (BS) in Computer Science, Master of Science (MS) in Computer Science, Doctor of Philosophy (Ph.D.) in Computer Sciences.
Mechatronics Engineering: Bachelor of Engineering (BE) in Mechatronics Engineering
Social Sciences: Bachelor of Science (BS) in Social Sciences and Economics, Master of Science (MS) in Social Sciences and Economics and Doctor of Philosophy (Ph.D.) in Social Sciences and Economics.
Media Sciences: Bachelor of Science (BS) in Media Sciences with majors in Production and Advertising.
Biosciences: Bachelor of science (BS) in Biosciences and BS in Biotechnology, Masters of Science (MS) in Biosciences and Doctor of Philosophy (PhD) in Biosciences.
Public Health: Master of Public Health (MPH) and Master of Science in Public Health (MSPH).
External programs: Zulfikar Ali Bhutto Institute of Science and Technology offers external programs in Law (LLB) and Economics and Development (BSc) in collaboration with the University of London.
Intermediate program: SZABIST offers Intermediate at SZABIST Intermediate campus Larkana in affiliation with Board of Intermediate and Secondary Education, Larkana (BISE Larkana).
Intermediate program: SZABIST offers Intermediate at SZABIST Intermediate campus Shaheed Benazirabad in affiliation with Board of Intermediate and Secondary Education, Shaheed Benazirabad (BISE SBA).

Intermediate program: SZABIST offers Intermediate at SZABIST Intermediate campus Hyderabad in affiliation with Board of Intermediate and Secondary Education, Hyderabad (BISE Hyderabad).
Intermediate program: SZABIST offers Intermediate at SZABIST Intermediate campus Tando Muhammad Khan in affiliation with Board of Intermediate and Secondary Education, Hyderabad (BISE Hyderabad).

HEC ranking
SZABIST ranked amongst the top three universities for 2014 in Business and Information Technology by the Higher Education Commission (HEC).

International agreements
SZABIST has signed articulation agreements with the University of South Wales and the University of Northampton, UK. SZABIST has signed MoUs with the State University of New York, USA; University of London, UK; Philippine Women's University, Philippines and the Asian Academy of Film & Television, India.

ZAB Media Festival
The ZAB Media Festival is an annual event organized by the Department of Media Sciences.

References

External links
 SZABIST official website

Universities and colleges in Dubai
Universities and colleges in Islamabad
Educational institutions established in 1995
1995 establishments in Pakistan
Engineering universities and colleges in Pakistan
Universities and colleges in Karachi
Private universities and colleges in Sindh
Islamabad Capital Territory
Memorials to Zulfikar Ali Bhutto